Sloat-Horn-Rossell House, also known as "The Manor," is a historic home located at Berkeley Springs, Morgan County, West Virginia.  It was built in 1879, and is a large two-story  Second Empire style dwelling with board-and-batten siding. It is roughly "L" shaped consisting of a roughly square main unit and a smaller rectangular kitchen and servant quarter extension.

It was listed on the National Register of Historic Places in 1984.  It is located within the Town of Bath Historic District, listed on the National Register of Historic Places in 2009.

References

Bath (Berkeley Springs), West Virginia
Houses on the National Register of Historic Places in West Virginia
Second Empire architecture in West Virginia
Houses completed in 1879
Houses in Morgan County, West Virginia
National Register of Historic Places in Morgan County, West Virginia
Individually listed contributing properties to historic districts on the National Register in West Virginia